Payne Township is a township in Sedgwick County, Kansas, United States. As of the 2000 United States Census, it has a population of 1,119.

History
Payne Township was named for David L. Payne, a pioneer known as the "Father of Oklahoma".

References

Townships in Sedgwick County, Kansas
Townships in Kansas